Karin Tammemägi (born 4 June 1975 in Kaalepi) is an Estonian politician. She was a member of XIII Riigikogu.

References

Living people
1975 births
Estonian Centre Party politicians
Members of the Riigikogu, 2015–2019
Women members of the Riigikogu
Tallinn University alumni
People from Järva Parish
21st-century Estonian women politicians